The European Research Executive Agency (REA) (formerly Research Executive Agency) is a funding body mandated by the European Commission to support the EU Research and Innovation policy. It has been established by the European Commission, based on Council Regulation (EC) No 58/2003.

Background 
The REA was set up by the European Commission in December 2007 (via Decision 2008/46/EC) to implement parts of the Seventh EU Framework Programme for research, technological development and demonstration activities (FP7). In 2013, the European Commission extended REA's mandate further, delegating a significant part of Horizon 2020 actions to the agency. In February 2021, the Commission renewed and extended the agency’s mandate once again through the Commission implementing decision (EU) 2021/173, which establishes the six executive agencies. Under the 2021-2027 EU long-term budget, the agency manages several EU programmes, as well as services that support the implementation of EU funded projects in research and innovation, and beyond. In addition, REA handles procurement activities for the European Commission. REA’s emphasis remains on research and innovation activities.

Responsibilities & Programme implementation 
Since 1 April 2021, the REA is responsible for:

 Managing projects supported under Horizon Europe, the world’s largest framework programme for research and innovation to date. In particular, the Agency is responsible for:
 Marie Skłodowska-Curie Actions
 Research infrastructures
 Culture, creativity and inclusive society
 Civil security for society
 Food, bioeconomy, natural resources, agriculture and environment
 Widening participation and spreading excellence
 Reforming and enhancing the European R&I system

 Managing projects supported under Horizon 2020, the EU’s previous framework programme for research and innovation (2014-2020).
 Implementing the European Union programmes Promotion of agricultural products and the Research Fund for Coal and Steel.
 Assisting funding and tender applicants, beneficiaries and independent experts.
 Managing the European Commission’s Research Enquiry Service, which answers questions from grant applicants, EU-funded researchers and the public.
 Contracting and supporting independent experts in the evaluation of project proposals competing for EU research funds, and in their monitoring of EU-funded projects.
 Conducting the legal and financial validation of all European Union programme grants and procurement operations directly funded by the European Commission.

Governance 

The REA has its own legal personality, but is supervised by the European Commission. The agency is managed by its current director Marc Tachelet, together with its steering committee.

Budget 

The REA manages a budget of €22.7 billion between 2021 and 2027, which is a substantial increase from the two former seven-year budgets it has managed: 

Under the EU's Framework Programme for Research and Innovation, Horizon 2020, the budget managed by the REA was €17 billion for the period 2014–2020. Under the EU's 7th Research Framework Programme (2007–2013), the total budget managed by the REA was €6.4 billion.

External links
Official website

References 

       2. "EUR-Lex - 32008D0046 - EN - EUR-Lex". eur-lex.europa.eu.

3. "EUR-Lex - 32013D0778(01) - EN - EUR-Lex". eur-lex.europa.eu.

4. "Eur-Lex - 32021D0173 - EN - EUR-Lex" eur-lex.europa.eu.
European Union and science and technology
Executive agencies of the European Commission